The Ups and Downs is a 1914 American silent Western film starring Wallace Beery and Charles J. Stine. The silent short was produced by the Essanay Film Manufacturing Company and distributed by the General Film Company.

External links
 

1914 films
1914 comedy films
1910s Western (genre) comedy films
American black-and-white films
American Western (genre) comedy films
American silent short films
Silent American Western (genre) films
1910s American films
Silent American comedy films